Jordana Beatty (born 30 January 1998) is an Australian award-winning actress best known for playing the title role of Judy Moody in the feature film Judy Moody and the Not Bummer Summer and Susan Parks in the 10th anniversary tour of Billy Elliot the Musical.

History
Beatty started acting in 2002, and appeared in Australian television commercials. She has played roles in the Home and Away and All Saints television series. She also played the character Rachel in the television series Legend of the Seeker.

In 2012, she was nominated for the Young Artist Award as Best Leading Young Actress for her role in the film Judy Moody and the Not Bummer Summer. She was also cast to play the title role in Eloise in Paris alongside Uma Thurman, but the film was never made.

In 2013, she was cast as Optimism in Mind Over Maddie, a local children's program on Disney Channel Australia, and in 2019, she was cast as ballerina Susan Parks in the 10th anniversary Australian tour of Billy Elliot the Musical.

Filmography

Television

Film

Awards and nominations

References

External links

1998 births
Living people
Australian child actresses
Australian film actresses
Australian television actresses
21st-century Australian actresses